Several series, miniseries, and special issues of comic books based on the science fiction television series Star Trek: The Next Generation have been published by DC Comics and their imprint, Wildstorm.

For more information, see Star Trek spin-off fiction.

Volume 1

The miniseries was later collected in 1995 as the trade paperback Star Trek: The Next Generation:  Beginnings.

Volume 2

Annuals

DC miniseries

Ill Wind
Hugh Fleming painted the covers to this series.

The Modala Imperative
Sequel to series of the same name set during TOS.

Shadowheart

Star Trek: The Next Generation/Deep Space Nine
Crossover with Malibu Comics.

DC specials

DC one-shots

Series finale adaptation

Wildstorm miniseries

Perchance to Dream
This series, which features covers by Timothy Bradstreet, takes place between "All Good Things..." and Generations.

The Killing Shadows
All have cover art by Andrew Currie with Bryan Hitch and John Stanisci. Edited by Jeff Marriotte. Takes place after "First Contact".

Wildstorm one-shots

Embrace the Wolf
Takes place on Stardate 47319.2

Forgiveness
Produced in hardcover and softcover editions.

The Gorn Crisis
Produced in hardcover and softcover editions.

Wildstorm compilations

Enemy Unseen
Star Trek: The Next Generation: Enemy Unseen, first printed in 2001, contains mini-series Perchance to Dream and The Killing Shadows, and one-shot "Embrace the Wolf". The book features a painted cover by Drew Struzan, is edited by Jeff Marriotte and designed by Amber Bennett.

References

External links
 Star Trek Comics Checklist

Next Generation
Star Trek The Next Generation
DC Comics titles
WildStorm titles